Governor Martinez may refer to:

Antonio María Martínez (died 1823), 38th Governor of the Spanish Colony of Texas
Bob Martinez (born 1934), 40th Governor of Florida
Susana Martinez (born 1959), 31st Governor of New Mexico